Japan accepted the UNESCO World Heritage Convention on 30 June 1992. As of July 2021, twenty-five properties have been inscribed on the World Heritage List: twenty cultural sites and five natural sites. A further five sites and one site extension have been submitted for future inscription and are currently on the Tentative List as of 2017.

Map

World Heritage Sites

Tentative list
The Tentative List consists of sites previously nominated, but not yet inscribed.

Other UNESCO heritage lists

See also

 Cultural Properties of Japan
 National Treasures of Japan
 Cultural Landscapes of Japan
 National parks of Japan

References

External links
  World Heritage Sites in Japan
  Database of National Cultural Properties - World Heritage (世界遺産)

 
Japan
Cultural history of Japan
Landmarks in Japan
Lists of tourist attractions in Japan